Bushkill Falls is a series of eight privately owned waterfalls, the tallest of which cascades over , located in Lehman Township, Pennsylvania in the Pocono Mountains. Water of the Little Bush Kill and Pond Run Creek descends the mountain, toward the Delaware River, forming Bushkill Falls, Bridal Veil Falls, Bridesmaid Falls, Laurel Glen Falls, Pennell Falls, and three additional, unnamed falls.

Bushkill Falls is a popular spot for hiking and birdwatching. The area features a variety of trails and bridges that vary in length and difficulty.

Notes 
Bushkill Falls is nicknamed "Niagara Falls of Pennsylvania."  It was opened to the public in 1904 by Charles E. Peters, and is still owned by the Peters family.

There is an admission fee for the park of $17.50 for adults per day, $13.50 for seniors per day, and $8.50 for children ages 4–10 per day.

The main falls, named Bushkill Falls, and the main canyon area are accessible via boardwalk and stairs. Outside of the main canyon area the trails are mostly dirt and stone, with boardwalks and bridges in certain areas.

On August 13, 2011, one person died after falling  into the falls. Two teenage boys walked off marked trails and one of the boys lost his footing and fell into the falls. He was pronounced dead on the scene.

In the mid-1880s, the Swiss-born American artist Adolfo Müller-Ury (1862–1947) painted a large canvas depicting the major torrent of the Bushkill Falls. It was donated to the Von der Heydt Museum, Wuppertal, by Erich Hahne in 1958.

See also

Dingmans Falls
Silverthread Falls

References

External links 

Visit Bushkill Falls website

Pocono Mountains
Waterfalls of Pennsylvania
Waterfalls of Pike County, Pennsylvania
Tourist attractions in Pike County, Pennsylvania
Tiered waterfalls
Delaware Water Gap National Recreation Area